The Salmson Phrygane ("Caddisfly") was a French light aircraft of the 1930s.

Design and production
The Phrygane was a conventional, high-wing strut-braced monoplane with fixed tailwheel undercarriage and a fully enclosed cabin for the pilot and either two or four passengers, depending on the version. Salmson sold about 25 examples before the outbreak of World War II.

Following the war, CFA attempted to revive the design, but only four examples were built.

Operational history
The Phrygane was flown by private pilot owners and by aero clubs. Several examples of this aircraft design survived the war and a few postwar modified aircraft were built by CFA. A D-211 was still in service with Avia Nord at Lille Lesquin airfield during July 1965.

Variants
 D-1 Phrygane – prototype with Salmson 7Aca engine (one built)
 D-2 Phrygane – main production version with Salmson 9Nc engine (23 built)
 D-21 Phrygane – postwar four-seat version of D2 (one built)
 D-211 Super Phrygane – final postwar version of 1951 with Salmson 7Aq (one built)
 D-3 Phryganet – two-seat version of 1936 (one built)
 D-57 Phryganet – postwar version of D3 (one built)
 D-4 Phrygane Major – 1935 version with Salmson 9Nd (one built)

Specifications (D2)

References

 
 
 aviafrance.com

1930s French civil utility aircraft
Salmson aircraft
Single-engined tractor aircraft
High-wing aircraft
Aircraft first flown in 1933